The 1885 Invercargill mayoral election was held on 26 November 1885.

In a rematch from the 1882 election, John Lyon McDonald was elected, defeating former mayor John Kingsland.

Results
The following table gives the election results:

References

1885 elections in New Zealand
Mayoral elections in Invercargill